The South Sudan Electricity Corporation (SSEC) is a parastatal company whose primary purpose is to generate electric power for use in South Sudan and for sale to neighboring countries.

History
The SSEC was established in 2012 under the Ministry of Energy and Mining of South Sudan, following the split from Sudan and gaining independence the year before. At this point the country was only producing 25 MW of installed electricity generation capacity with only 1% of the country’s nine-million people having access to electricity.

On January 24, 2014, the SSEC was approved for a grant from the African Development Bank Group to rehabilitate and expand the distribution networks in Juba.

SSEC Timeline

January 24, 2014: Received a US$26 million dollar grant from African Development Bank Group to rehabilitate and expand the distribution networks in Juba.

Power stations

Operational stations

Power stations in development

See also

List of power stations in South Sudan
Energy in South Sudan

References

2012 establishments in South Sudan
Energy companies established in 2012
Companies of South Sudan